DXDX may refer to:
 DXDX-AM, an AM radio station broadcasting in General Santos, Philippines, branded as Radyo Ronda
 DXDX-FM, an FM radio station broadcasting in Iligan, Philippines, branded as Radyo Pilipinas